Elli Papakonstantinou (Greek: Έλλη Παπακωνσταντίνου), is a stage director, librettist, translator, cultural manager and activist. Her theatre combines music, new media and philosophical discourse within the range of music theatre, new opera and social engagement. Papakonstantinou shaped her ideas from the civic movements that emerged in Greece during the crisis. Twice a Fulbright Award recipient, Papakonstantinou has been commissioned by European Capitals of Culture (Eleusis 2021, Valletta 2018 and Pafos 2017), PQ'15 – Prague Quadrennial of Performance Design and Space, 2015 (CZ), while her work has been presented for the European Parliament for Culture and toured internationally.

Papakonstantinou connects notions of myth and gender philosophy by revisiting the classics and creating immersive experiences. She is the founder of the international company ODC Ensemble. Named a Visiting CCRMA Scholar at Stanford University and a visiting scholar at Princeton University, she has been awarded the Fulbright Artist’s Award twice. Her creations have toured internationally at the Centre Georges Pompidou/ IRCAM (FR), Brooklyn Academy of Music (US),The Royal Dramatic Theatre of Sweden, Avignon Festival (FR), Operadagen Festival (NL), Neuköllner Oper Berlin (DE), Romaeuropa Festival (IT), LaMaMa E.T.C. (US),The West End (UK), National Theatre of Greece (GR) and more.

Education and early career (1995–2004) 
Papakonstantinou was born and raised in Athens, Greece. She holds a BA degree from the Faculty of Fine Arts, at the Aristotle University of Thessaloniki, Greece. In 1995 she moved to the U.K. and completed an M.A. at the Royal Holloway, University of London.

During that period, Papakonstantinou was associated with playwrights of the 'In-yer-face’ movement like Sarah Kane, Tamatha Hammerschlag and Lil Warren and made her directorial debut with Lil Warren's "Nine Lives, Ten Tales", which won the First prize Award at the Edinburgh Fringe Festival 1997, UK. In 1999, she directed "The Suppliants After Aeschylus After Kosovo", a reimagined version of Aeschylus’ The Suppliants written by the South African playwright Tamantha Hammerschlag at the Gilded Balloon, Edinburgh Festival 1999 (UK).

Papakonstantinou collaborated with directors Matthias Langhoff (The Bacchae presented at Athens & Epidaurus Festival 1997, assistant) and V. Papavasiliou (Oedipus Rex presented at the Colosseum, Rome, Italy in the frame of the Sophocles 2000 Colosseum Festival).

Her staging of the Odyssey  titled "ODC after Homer" was presented at the Edinburgh Fringe Festival in August 2002. The production was described  as "a fascinating, different approach to the ancient Greek text" by the online Greek Section of BBC, while also being invited to the official Inauguration of the Bibliotheca Alexandrina, in Alexandria, Egypt.

Papakonstantinou debuted in Greece with the performance the "Decameron of Women", a gender approach to Vocace's Decameron about women in the Soviet Union during Nikita Khrushchev.

Other collaborations in the field of new writing include the direction of "Destiny" and "A Night of Secrets" by Akis Dimou at the National Theatre of Greece, "The Sound of the Gun" by Loula Anagnostaki, "The Country" by Martin Crimp, radio-play Three Women: A Monologue for Three Voices by Sylvia Plath, "The Iron" by Rona Munro and more.

In 2004, she spent Spring at the Music & Advanced Media Department at Princeton University with a "Fulbright Artist's Award 2004-2005" and a "Stanley J. Seeger Visiting Fellowship", where she developed a passion for the development of new media for musical theatre.

Founding of Vyrsodepseio
In 2011, Papakonstantinou, in her capacity as artistic director of the theatre company "ODC Ensemble", founded "Vyrsodepseio" (Βυρσοδεψείο = Tannery), a cultural venue for theatre performances, concerts and exhibitions housed at a defunct tannery of 3000 m2 in Athens,  which she directed until 2016. A short documentary by Maria Chatzigianni, featuring interviews with Elli Papakonstantinou and other artists, was released in 2014.

Papakonstantinou revisited the classics with an emphasis on music in productions "A Winter's Tale" by William Shakespeare at the National Theatre of Cyprus and "Woyzeck Quartet",  after Alban Berg's Wozzeck which premiered at the Athens & Epidaurus Festival. Scholar Xenia Georgopoulou commented on an idiosyncratic version of William Shakespeare's "Richard II" that Papakonstantinou presented at Vyrsodepseio that it "focused on the similarities between the play and the political context" with the director herself remarking that"[t]he text is remarkably topical" and "that her production was intended for a popular audience, not for the small social elite, which had long been the targeted audience".

Papakonstantinou introduced the term "Theatre of the Polis" while describing and advocating for socially engaged art like "META [AFTER]" and "ΔΕΡΜΑ [SKIN]".

International work

In May 2014, Papakonstantinou participated at a tribute to contemporary Greek theatre that was held at the Panta Théâtre in Caen, France, where she directed Elena Penga's play Femme et Loup (Woman and Wolf). Revolt Athenς, a performance written and directed by Papakonstantinou and inspired by contemporary Greek reality and the ongoing Greek crisis, has been her most widely toured and acclaimed performance to date. The production premiered at the Antik Theatre in Barcelona in February 2015 under the title "Re-final Countdown, 2004, Athens", followed by performances at Musiktheatertage Festival in Vienna, Neukoellner Oper in Berlin and the BE Festival in Birmingham, UK in July 2017, where it won the First Prize Award for the REP and was invited back for the 2018 edition of the BE Festival. "Revolτ Aτhenς" opened the Athens & Epidaurus Festival in June 2016 and was also presented at the Acco Festival in Israel, September 2017. The show excelled for its artistic quality and social impact and was proudly selected to perform for the European Parliament for Culture in the frame of the Operadagen Festival, Rotterdam, in 2017.

In May 2017, Papakonstantinou presented "The Backstage of Revolution", a site-specific performance inspired by the French Revolution, as part of the official programme of Athens & Epidaurus Festival. Later that year, her newest piece, "Stabat Parthenope" was staged at the Altofest in Naples (IT).

"Każin Barokk", an opera conceived, written and directed by Papakonstantinou and commissioned by Valletta 2018, European Capital of Culture, was held at the Notre Dame Gate in Birgu, Malta, in September 2018.

In 2018, Papakonstantinou toured Europe with "The Cave", drawing on Plato's well-known allegory. The Cave was presented amongst other places at the Repertory theatre, Birmingham (BE Festival), the Aalborg Opera Festival, Copenhagen Opera Festival and the Megaron (Athens Concert Hall). In December 2018, The Cave was awarded the International Music Theatre Now Award for first productions of new works. In its official statement, the awards jury praised the performance for "taking us by storm with its powerful sound and visuals from the very first minute".

In 2018, she received for a second time a Fulbright Artist's Award to serve as a visiting scholar for six months (October 2018 - April 2019) at the CCRMA – Center for Computer Research in Music and Acoustics, Stanford University, US. The new media cinematic opera "Oedipus, Sex with Mum was Blinding" (libretto and direction) premiered in the USA in April 2019 and is currently on tour.

In 2019 she wrote and directed for the Austrian Regionen Festival the anti-fascist play “The Kindly Ones”, based on Aechylus’s “The Eumenides” that was presented at the Mauthausen Concentration Camp and at the Festival Off d’ Avignon ‘21 after completing a special writing residency at the  Center National des écritures du Spectacle, la Chartreuse.

The global lockdowns of 2020 have led her to experiment with a new form of digital theatre, specifically designed for the ZOOM platform, that she came to call “theatre of seclusion”. In 2020 she presented “Traces of Antigone”, written by Christina Ouzounidis, one of the first live digital performances. The performance won the AMAZONE 2020 award and was nominated for the Italian Critics Award, and continues its international tour both in digital and physical form.  Her digital works “Aède of the Ocean and Land” and “Hotel AntiOedipus”, were presented at festivals and organizations around the world such as the famed IRCAM/Centre Pompidou (Paris), Romaeuropa Festival (Rome)  to critical acclaim.

Papakonstantinou's latest creation "ALKESTIS", a commission of the Royal Theatre of Sweden in collaboration with the Royal Opera of Sweden, premiered on December 2, 2021 in Stockholm.

She is currently developing “EROS”, an international co-production with Nova Opera, supported by the Greek Ministry of Culture and the Ukrainian House Of Europe, which is scheduled to premiere in the Spring of 2022 at O. Festival in Rotterdam.

As an activist and networker, Papakonstantinou, partnered three Creative Europe projects (Polart Circle, Creative Lenses, Europe Grand Central) and international networks Trans Europe Halles and IETM – International Network for Contemporary Performing Arts.

Papakonstantinou sat at the Board of Directors of the Hellenic Broadcasting Corporation (ΕΡΤ: Ελληνική Ραδιοφωνία Τηλεόραση) and was President of ERT Funding Board for film for two years. She has been invited to teach and attend conferences around the world and has translated for the stage.

Papakonstantinou has been invited to teach courses and workshops at the University of Princeton (as a fellow reader at the Music & Advanced Media Lab), the University of London (Royal Holloway, Drama Department), the Stanford University, the University of Peloponnesus, the Summer Academy of the National Theatre of Greece, the Valletta University and more.

The Theatre of Seclusion 
It is a live-streamed performance developed, designed and executed in seclusion in the many different homes of the artists, who join forces to create one unique audiovisual experience, a cinematic concert in synchronicity.
“Theatre of seclusion” comes with a set of rules and restrictions:

 We rehearse, develop and execute the whole piece in quarantine with the help of digital platforms.
 We are allowed to make use only of the props, musical instruments, set environment, costumes and technical means that were made available to us when quarantined; no add-ons later on! Our home is the set.
 Public space and home space merge into one. The tagged names on our windows name us and reconfigure anonymity and objectification, always already “singular-plural”, in the elsewhere and otherwise
 We work in seclusion from our homes like women before us. Are we trapped, safe or emancipated? It is up to our viewers to tell, as we grant them permission to invade our most intimate world. Zoom in to details, zoom out to the galaxies.
 We all use the same basic technology to weave in synchronicity this new age audiovisual 
 Embroidering. We invite viewers to interact with the performance, thus propelled to the public agora.

Curation and production 
Between 2011 and 2017, Papakonstantinou produced and/or curated most platforms and programs of Vyrsodepseio Art Space, Athens (GR) in total more than 100 festivals of music and dance, performances and international collaborations like: Catalan artists meet Greek artists platform, a partnership of Vyrsodepseio and Antic Teatre, Barcelona; Site-Specific Festival I, II and III, three-day festivals with more than 300 participant artists; Month of Greek Theatre in France and Month of French Theatre in Greece, June 2014 (co-curated with D. Kondylaki and G. Kakoudaki); A partnership of Vyrsodepseio with the Institut Français (GR), Panta Théâtre, Maison Antoine Vitez (FR); Performance Art Workshops (co-curated with K. Diapouli) and Dramaturgy Workshops (co-curated with D. Kondylaki and G. Kakoudaki).

Awards and Distinctions

Publications 
 The Actor and the Target, Translator, text by Decklan Donnelan, Nefeli Editions, 2010
 The Outcry by Tennessee Williams, Sokoli-Kouledaki Editions, 2011 (co-translator with Athina Maximou)
 Greek Art in a State of Emergency, ACAR – ITI Action Committee For Artists Rights, 2015
 The Manifest, Journal of Greek Media & Culture, Vol.3, Issue 2, Eds. F. Hager, M. Fragkou, 2017
Models to Manifestos, A conceptual Toolkit for Arts and Culture, Olivearte Cultural Agency, 2019
A θeatre in Times of Crisis, NEFELI Editions, 2018

See also
 List of Greek women artists

References

External links
Elli Papakonstantinou official website
Vimeo
YouTube
CCRMA, Stanford University

Women theatre directors
Stanford University alumni
Princeton University alumni
1973 births
Living people